Oscar Oswald Oktovianus Wambrauw (born 8 October 1968) is an Indonesian academician who is serving as the Rector of the Cenderawasih University since 21 November 2022.

Life and career 
Wambrauw was born on 8 October 1968 in Biak. After graduating from high school, he continued his study at the Faculty of Economics of the Cenderawasih University. He graduated from the university with a bachelor's degree in economics in 1994. From there, he went abroad and studied agriculture at the University of Göttingen and obtained a master's degree in agriculture in 1999. 

Wambrauw joined the Cenderawasih University shortly after his graduation from the University of Gottingen, where he taught management sciences. He continued studying management at the Brawijaya University and obtained a doctorate in management from the university in 2013. He received a promotion to the rank of chief lector shortly after. Around November 2016, Wambrauw was noted to have served as the First Vice Dean of the Faculty of Economics of the Cenderawasih University.

Around 2019, Wambrauw was entrusted by the Rector of the Cenderawasih University to head the university's higher education database (PDPT, Pangkalan Data Pendidikan Tinggi). He was further promoted as the First Vice Rector of the Cenderawasih University on 1 December 2021. About a year later, on 22 November 2022, Wambrauw was appointed as the Rector of the Cenderawasih University, replacing Apolo Safanpo who became the acting governor of South Papua.

References 

1963 births
Living people
People from Biak
Cenderawasih University alumni
University of Göttingen alumni